The British Seagull was a British manufacturer of two-stroke outboard engines in Poole, Dorset from the late 1930s until the mid-1990s.  Although their "Classic" engines were for decades an exemplar of rugged simplicity and reliability, the company eventually failed when customer tastes changed and as tighter emissions regulations took effect.  Production of complete engines stopped in 1996, and another company bought the rights to the brand in 1999.  Spare parts continue to be produced for existing engines.

History
British Seagull outboards were first sold under the name Marston Seagull.  They were developed at John Marston Ltd's "Sunbeamland" factory in Wolverhampton by development engineers John Way-Hope and Bill Pinninger. This pair later bought the manufacturing rights in 1937 and marketed outboards as Bristol Seagull, later moving to Poole and settling for the name British Seagull.

There are several different British Seagull outboard motor models, usually with a single cylinder water-cooled two-stroke engine. Originally known as "The Best Outboard in the World", then changed to "The Best Outboard Motor for the World". Some of the engines had the Villiers patented flywheel magneto, and on its port side was a simple carburettor. Above the cylinder head was bolted a small  brass fuel tank whose 10:1, or 25:1 depending on age, fuel/oil mix was gravity-fed to the carburettor via a fuel line. Starting was effected with a hand-wound pull-rope, although a recoil starter was an option. Connecting the motor to the gearbox and propeller were two downtubes, the forward one containing the drive shaft and the aft tube serving as the exhaust, which vented underwater.

The engines proved very rugged as they used high quality materials, and thousands have lasted for years, even in harsh marine environments many in developing countries too. Seagull outboards were utilitarian in nature with a relatively slow-turning prop, and so were ideal for use in dinghies, tenders and small yachts. The Silver Century Plus model could propel a displacement hull of up to 26 feet in length but Seagull outboards were unsuitable for high speed craft.

Models
An early engine of the company was the Model 102, developed from the Marston models of the 1930s.  The Model 102 engines were fairly large and featured an integral engine cylinder block and head, with a water-injected exhaust.  Some Model 102  outboards had a  propeller, gaining the moniker of "The Barge Pusher".

The model range  for which Seagull is most famous is the "Classic" range.  These "square block models" comprised the 64 cc Featherweight (aka Forty Minus) and Forty Plus, and the 102 cc Century and Century Plus.  The Forty Minus and Plus used identical power units, but the Plus had a larger gearbox and propeller.  The Century and Century Plus used even larger gearboxes and propellers.  Classic model engines were produced from the late 1950s until the mid-1990s, and many examples are still in everyday use. The long life span is down to the high quality metals and the use of high-tensile bolts and studs.

In the early 1980s the factory produced a new series of British Seagull outboards, the QB series.  The power units were developed by Queen's University, Belfast (hence QB) whose Mechanical Engineering Department specialised in modernising two-stroke design. Painted black and sometimes known as the Irish Seagull, they featured quieter, more efficient engines, with a water-cooled exhaust and modified cylinder porting.

In the late 1980s British Seagull introduced two further models to their range, the Model 170 and the Model 125. Fitted with a cowling to enclose the engine, they featured upgraded carburettors and cylinder blocks.  Both new models suffered from poorly designed crankshaft bushings, resulting in warranty claims against the company.  Until that time the "Best Outboard Motor for the World" (as the marketing slogan ran) had an envious reputation for reliability, but these new models were never popular and they dented the company's image.

Towards the end of production a new model called the "5R" was introduced. The design of this engine was quite different from earlier models, using a conventional gearbox from a Yamaha 4HP outboard attached via an adaptor plate to a QB engine. These models were  painted blue, the very last examples (known as "gold tops") having propellers and recoil starters that were gold-painted.

Fuel/oil mix
Models manufactured from 1931 to 1945 had a recommended petrol-to-oil mix of either 8:1 or 10:1.  From 1942 models specified a 10:1 mix which was specified up to 1979.  After that date a 25:1 mix was specified, which was again changed for the introduction of the models 125 and 170, but these engines with the 50:1 mix soon failed, and British Seagull again specified 25:1.  This relatively high percentage of oil was necessary due to the way the crankshaft bushings worked.  Early engines used short bushings, and later ones used longer bushings, hence the changes in oil requirement.  The longer bushings were, in fact, used from 1967 onwards, and the engines from 1967 to 1979 can be used on the 25:1 mix by making carburettor adjustments.

References

External links 

British Seagull
British Seagull – Sheridan Marine

Defunct manufacturing companies of the United Kingdom
Marine engine manufacturers
Engine manufacturers of the United Kingdom